Shri Karan Narendra College of Agriculture, also SKN College of Agriculture, is a college located in Jobner, Rajasthan, India. It is the first institute for agriculture education to be established in Rajasthan. It is a constituent college of Sri Karan Narendra Agriculture University.

History
Late Rawal Karan Singh of Jobner was inspired by Swami Dayanand Saraswati and established Anglo-Vedic High School in the year 1893. His son Rawal Narendra Singh upgraded the school to Shri Karan Narendra College of Agriculture in the year of Indian independence, July 1947. At the time of creation this was the only institute devoted to agricultural education in the state of Rajasthan in India. At present it has 15 departments and offer B.Sc.(Ag.) Hons, M.Sc.(Ag.) in 11 and Ph.D in 8 subjects. The faculty is 100 strong and the non-teaching faculty is 400 strong. The student enrollment is about 400.

Admission Procedure
Degrees Offered : B.Sc. (Ag.) Hons, M.Sc. (Ag.), Ph.D

B.Sc. (Ag.) Hons

Admission to B.Sc (Ag.) Hons Part-I is done through Joint Entrance Test (JET) conducted either by the Rajasthan Agricultural University, Bikaner or Maharana Pratap University of Agriculture and Technology, Udaipur. The minimum eligibility for a candidate to appear in the JET is that the candidate must have passed 12th of the 10+2 (Academic) scheme of examination with Agriculture/Science groups.

Teaching
The college imparts training in basic at UG level as well as scientific skills, by PG level (M.Sc.(Ag.), Ph.D) with a view to prepare a student career directly and indirectly concerned with the upliftment of agricultural community.

Departments

The First Batch
The S. K. N College's very first batch, that had enrolled in this first agriculture college of state in the July, 1947 and they became the part of remembrance in the history of the college, always were as;

References
 Information Bulletin (2006–07). Faculty of Agricultural, Rajasthan Agricultural University, Bikaner. [edited by: Dr. S. P. Majumdar and Dr. A. C. Mathur]
 REMINISCENCES (1947-1997). On Golden Jubilee of S K N College of Agriculture, Jobner. [Chief Editor: Dr. B.R. Chhipa]

External links
http://cs-test.ias.ac.in/cs/php/toc.php?vol=094&issue=12

Agricultural universities and colleges in Rajasthan
Colleges in Rajasthan
Jaipur district